The 1980 Grand Prix d'Automne was the 74th edition of the Paris–Tours cycle race and was held on 28 September 1980. The race started in Blois and finished in Chaville. The race was won by Daniel Willems of the IJsboerke team.

General classification

References

1980 in French sport
1980
1980 Super Prestige Pernod